Honey Creek is a stream in Sauk County, Wisconsin, United States. It is a tributary of the Wisconsin River. It was so named because early settlers collected the honey of bees there. It also lends its name to the town of Honey Creek.

See also
List of rivers of Wisconsin

References

Rivers of Sauk County, Wisconsin
Rivers of Wisconsin